Swedish Armed Forces Medal of Merit (FMGM and FMSM) is a Swedish reward medal established by the Swedish Armed Forces and is awarded for action during combat or during war-like situations. The decision to award the medal is taken by the Supreme Commander and can be awarded to both Swedish and foreign personnel.

History
The medal was established through a merger between the Swedish Armed Forces International Service Medal of Reward [in silver or gold with blue ribbon coated with a sword in silver] (Försvarsmaktens belöningsmedalj för internationella insatser [i silver eller guld med blått band belagt med svärd i silver]) and the Swedish Armed Forces Medal of Merit ("for commendable efforts") [in silver or gold with yellow ribbon (in some cases coated with a sword in each denomination)] (Försvarsmaktens förtjänstmedalj ("för berömliga insatser") [i silver eller guld med gult band (i vissa fall belagt med svärd i respektive valör]). These two medals are no longer awarded.

The Medal of Merit established in 2008 can be awarded regardless of the circumstances prevailing at the time of the operation; national, international operations, actions during war-like circumstances or other personal effort or activity. The medal criteria are also applicable if Sweden is at war (armed conflict). The Medal of Merit will be awarded to anyone, whether he belongs to or operates in the Swedish Armed Forces or not and irrespective of his nationality.

Appearance
The medal is divided into two classes, gold medal and silver medal. The medal is made from gilded hallmarked silver and hallmarked silver with 31 mm diameter. The obverse side shows the Swedish Armed Forces heraldic arms and around the outer edge the text "FOR MERITORIOUS SERVICES" (FÖR FÖRTJÄNSTFULLA INSATSER). The reverse shows around the outer edge a laurel wreath and is otherwise smooth and can be equipped with the holder's name, year of awarding and, if appropriate, country. The medal is also made in miniature. There is also a diploma that comes with the medal.

The medal is worn with a blue ribbon with a broad yellow stripe in the middle and one narrow on each side. On the ribbon there is an erect sword in gold or silver if the medal is awarded for actions in combat or during war-like situations. Instead of the medal, the service ribbon can be worn. It's provided with a horizontal sword of gold or silver if the medal awarded for actions in combat or during  war-like situations.

Presenting

In each class, the medal can be awarded either for actions in battle or during war-like situations or for personal efforts in other circumstances. The medal may be awarded to Swedish and foreign citizens for meritorious services that benefited the Swedish Armed Forces and its operations. The decision to award the medal is taken by the Supreme Commander, usually following a proposal by the Supreme Commander's medal evaluation. The medal may be awarded posthumously and in that case, the medal is presented to the closest relative.

The medal shall normally be awarded by the Supreme Commander during ceremoniously events, e.g. on the National Day of Sweden or other appropriate ceremoniously events. The decision to award the medal to a member of the Swedish Armed Forces shall be introduced in the Swedish Armed Forces' personnel records. The Swedish Armed Forces Headquarters also has a register of all medals awarded, and any reasons for this.

Criteria
The medal with certificate is awarded to individuals according to the following guidelines:

Recipients

References

External links
Medals of the Swedish Armed Forces 

Orders, decorations, and medals of Sweden
Awards established in 2008
2008 establishments in Sweden